The Bank of Java (DJB, for ) was a note-issuing bank in the Dutch East Indies, founded in 1828, and nationalized in 1951 by the government of Indonesia to become the newly independent country’s central bank, later renamed Bank Indonesia. For more than a century, the Bank of Java was the central institution of the Dutch East Indies’ financial system, alongside the “big three” commercial banks (the Netherlands Trading Society, the Nederlandsch-Indische Handelsbank, and the Nederlandsch-Indische Escompto Maatschappij). It was both a note-issuing bank and a commercial bank.

Background
In 1752, it was renamed , and was given a mandate to extend loans to employees of the Dutch East India Company. In 1818, that institution closed as a consequence of financial crisis.

Dutch colonial period
King William I of the Netherlands granted the right to create a private bank in the Indies in 1826, which was named .

In 1829, it opened branch offices in Semarang and Surabaya. Later branch offices opened in Padang (1864), Makassar (1864), Cirebon (1866), Solo (1867), Pasuruan (1867), Yogyakarta (1879), Pontianak (1906), Bengkalis (1907), Medan (1907), Banjarmasin (1907), Tanjungbalai (1908), Tanjungpura (1908), Bandung (1909), Palembang (1909), Manado (1910), Malang (1916), Kutaraja / Banda Aceh (1918), Kediri (1923), Pematang Siantar (1923), and Madiun (1928). 

Until 1891, the DJB was represented in the mainland Netherlands by the Netherlands Trading Society. Some time later, DJB opened an office in New York.

Under the Japanese occupation of the Dutch East Indies during World War II, the occupation authorities closed the Bank of Java and all other Dutch and Western banks in March 1942, and endeavored to seize as much as possible of their assets. They replaced it with an ad hoc central bank for occupied Indonesia, named . The Bank of Java could only reopen after the surrender of Japan in the late summer of 1945.

Nationalization and aftermath
By that time, Europeans still represented four-fifths of the Bank's employees.

In 1962, Bank Indonesia moved to a new head office building. Its former main building on Station Square in Jakarta was left to deteriorate.

It was eventually liquidated in 2008.

Leadership

Presidents of the Bank of Java have included: 
 Chr. de Haan (1828–1838)
 C.J. Smulders (1838–1851)
  (1851–1863)
  (1863–1868)
 J.W.C. Diepenheim (1868–1870)
  (1870–1873)
  (1873–1889)
  (1889–1893)
 D. Groeneveld (1893–1898)
 J. Reijsenbach (1899–1906)
 Gerard Vissering (1906–1912)
  (1912–1924)
  (1924–1929)
  (1929–1945)
 J.C. van Waveren (1946)
 R.E. Smits (1946–1949)
 A. Houwink (1949–1951)
 Sjafruddin Prawiranegara (1951–1953)

Buildings
The building was comprehensively remodeled in 1926, was a new façade on Station Square. The head offices of the three large banks were built on adjacent lots in the 1920s and 1930s, namely the Nederlandsch-Indische Escompto Maatschappij to the north, the Netherlands Trading Society to the south, and the Nederlandsch-Indische Handelsbank to the northeast. 

The Amsterdam office was opened in 1891, at 60 Reguliersdwarsstraat, in a suite of offices hosted by the Hollandsche Hypotheekbank. It moved to Keizersgracht 668 in April 1892. The successor entity, Indover Bank, remained there until 1992, when it moved to Stadhouderskade.

Banknotes

See also
 Banque de l'Algérie
 Ottoman Bank
 Bank of Indochina
 Netherlands Indies gulden
 Japanese government-issued currency in the Dutch East Indies
 History of the Indonesian rupiah

Notes

Defunct banks of the Netherlands
Defunct companies of the Dutch East Indies